Southfield College was founded as Loreto College in Darjeeling in August 1961 as a women's college. At the request of the government of West Bengal, the Irish Branch of the Institute of the Blessed Virgin Mary, the Darjeeling Loreto Educational Society agreed to take care of its management. However, due to the lack of personnel, the Loreto nuns were compelled to hand over the college to the government of West Bengal, hence to be run as Southfield College.

College magazine
The name of the college magazine is Contextures. The magazine has contents in English, Nepali, Bengali and Hindi, which helps to bring out the literary skills of the students.

Gallery

See also

References

External links
 Official website
University of North Bengal
University Grants Commission
National Assessment and Accreditation Council

Women's universities and colleges in West Bengal
Universities and colleges in Darjeeling district
Colleges affiliated to University of North Bengal
Education in Darjeeling
Educational institutions established in 1961
1961 establishments in West Bengal